Hakeem Muhammad Ibrahim Khan Qasmi is a Pakistani politician who served as a member of the Provincial Assembly of Khyber Pakhtunkhwa and currently serving as the President of Pakistan Rah-e-Haq Party since February 2012.

Political career

He was elected to the Provincial Assembly of NWFP as an Independent
candidate from Constituency PF-04 (Peshawar-IV) in 2002 Pakistani  general election in the Constituency.

He is a former provincial leader of Sipah-e-Sahaba Pakistan.

In February 2012, he founded Pakistan Rah-e-Haq Party in Peshawar.

See also
Pakistan Rah-e-Haq Party

References

Pakistani politicians 
Members of the Provincial Assembly of Khyber Pakhtunkhwa
Living people
Year of birth missing (living people)